This is a list of the works of Henry James ( – ), an American writer who spent the bulk of his career in Britain.

Bibliography

Novels

Watch and Ward (1871)
Roderick Hudson (1875)
The American (1877)
The Europeans (1878)
Confidence (1879)
Washington Square (1880)
The Portrait of a Lady (1881)
The Bostonians (1886)
The Princess Casamassima (1886)
The Reverberator (1888)
The Tragic Muse (1890)
The Other House (1896)
The Spoils of Poynton (1897)
What Maisie Knew (1897)
The Awkward Age (1899)
The Sacred Fount (1901)
The Wings of the Dove (1902)
The Ambassadors (1903)
The Golden Bowl (1904)
The Whole Family (collaborative novel with eleven other authors, 1908)
The Outcry (1911)
The Ivory Tower (unfinished, published posthumously 1917)
The Sense of the Past (unfinished, published posthumously 1917)

Short stories and novellas

A Tragedy of Error (1864)
The Story of a Year (1865)
A Landscape Painter (1866)
A Day of Days (1866)
My Friend Bingham (1867)
Poor Richard (1867)
The Story of a Masterpiece (1868)
A Most Extraordinary Case (1868)
A Problem (1868)
De Grey: A Romance (1868)
Osborne's Revenge (1868)
The Romance of Certain Old Clothes (1868)
A Light Man (1869)
Gabrielle de Bergerac (1869)
Travelling Companions (1870)
A Passionate Pilgrim (1871)
At Isella (1871)
Master Eustace (1871)
Guest's Confession (1872)
The Madonna of the Future (1873)
The Sweetheart of M. Briseux (1873)
The Last of the Valerii (1874)
Madame de Mauves (1874)
Adina (1874)
Professor Fargo (1874)
Eugene Pickering (1874)
Benvolio (1875)
Crawford's Consistency (1876)
The Ghostly Rental (1876)
Four Meetings (1877)
Rose-Agathe (1878, as Théodolinde)
Daisy Miller (1878)
Longstaff's Marriage (1878)
An International Episode (1878)
The Pension Beaurepas (1879)
A Diary of a Man of Fifty (1879)
A Bundle of Letters (1879)
The Point of View (1882)
The Siege of London (1883)
Impressions of a Cousin (1883)
Lady Barberina (1884)
Pandora (1884)
The Author of Beltraffio (1884)
Georgina's Reasons (1884)
A New England Winter (1884)
The Path of Duty (1884)
Mrs. Temperly (1887)
Louisa Pallant (1888)
The Aspern Papers (1888)
The Liar (1888)
The Modern Warning (1888, originally published as The Two Countries)
A London Life (1888)
The Patagonia (1888)
The Lesson of the Master (1888)
The Solution (1888)
The Pupil (1891)
Brooksmith (1891)
The Marriages (1891)
The Chaperon (1891)
Sir Edmund Orme (1891)
Nona Vincent (1892)
The Real Thing (1892)
The Private Life (1892)
Lord Beaupré (1892)
The Visits (1892)
Sir Dominick Ferrand (1892)
Greville Fane (1892)
Collaboration (1892)
Owen Wingrave (1892)
The Wheel of Time (1892)
The Middle Years (1893)
The Death of the Lion (1894)
The Coxon Fund (1894)
The Altar of the Dead (1895)
The Next Time (1895)
Glasses  (1896)
The Figure in the Carpet (1896)
The Way It Came (1896, also published as The Friends of the Friends)
The Turn of the Screw (1898)
Covering End (1898)
In the Cage (1898)
John Delavoy (1898)
The Given Case (1898)
Europe (1899)
The Great Condition (1899)
The Real Right Thing (1899)
Paste (1899)
The Great Good Place (1900)
Maud-Evelyn (1900)
Miss Gunton of Poughkeepsie (1900)
The Tree of Knowledge (1900)
The Abasement of the Northmores (1900)
The Third Person (1900)
The Special Type (1900)
The Tone of Time (1900)
Broken Wings (1900)
The Two Faces (1900)
Mrs. Medwin (1901)
The Beldonald Holbein (1901)
The Story in It (1902)
Flickerbridge (1902)
The Birthplace (1903)
The Beast in the Jungle (1903)
The Papers (1903)
Fordham Castle (1904)
Julia Bride (1908)
The Jolly Corner (1908)
The Velvet Glove (1909)
Mora Montravers (1909)
Crapy Cornelia (1909)
The Bench of Desolation (1909)
A Round of Visits (1910)

Story collections

Terminations (1893)
The Soft Side (1900)
The Better Sort (1903)
New York Edition (1907–1909), "definitive" edition of James's fiction, selected and revised by James. 
Travelling Companions (1919)

Travel writings

Transatlantic Sketches (1875)
Portraits of Places (1883)
A Little Tour in France (1884)
English Hours (1905)
The American Scene (1907)
Italian Hours (1909)
Within the Rim (1918)

Plays

Theatricals (1894)
Theatricals: Second Series (1895)
Guy Domville (1895)

Essays and criticism

French Poets and Novelists (1878)
Hawthorne (1879)
Partial Portraits (1888)
Essays in London and Elsewhere (1893)
Picture and Text (1893)
William Wetmore Story and His Friends (1903)
The Question of our Speech; The Lesson of Balzac. Two Lectures (1905)
Views and Reviews (1908)
Notes on Novelists (1914)
A Most Unholy Trade (1925, published posthumously)
The Art of the Novel : Critical Prefaces (1934)

Memoirs

A Small Boy and Others (1913)
Notes of a Son and Brother (1914)
The Middle Years (unfinished, published posthumously 1917)
Notebooks (various, published posthumously)

External links
 
 
 
 
 
 
 The Henry James Collection From the Rare Book and Special Collections Division at the Library of Congress

 
Bibliographies by writer
Bibliographies of American writers
Bibliographies of English writers